The Halifax Cricket League with cricket clubs in and around the town of Halifax, West Yorkshire, England.

In the league there are also clubs from the nearby Calder Valley, city of Bradford, town of Huddersfield and the Spen Valley.

The leagues two main cup competitions are the 1st XI Parish Cup and 2nd XI Crossley Shield.

Member Clubs  

 Augustinians (Woodhouse)
 Blackley
 Booth
 Bradley & Colnebridge
 Bradshaw
 Bridgeholme
 Clayton
 Copley
 Cullingworth
 Great Horton Park Chapel
 Greetland

 Illingworth St Mary's
 Leymoor
 Low Moor Holy Trinity
 Luddendenfoot
 Mount
 Mytholmroyd
 Old Town
 Outlane
 Oxenhope
 Queensbury
 Shelf Northowram Hedge Top

 Southowram
 Sowerby Bridge
 Sowerby Bridge Church Institute (SBCI)
 Sowerby Bridge St Peters
 Stones
 Thornton
 Triangle
 Upper Hopton
 Warley

Current Sunday League Clubs that play in other leagues

 Almondbury Wesleyians (Huddersfield Cricket League)
 Barkisland (Huddersfield Cricket League)
 Birkby Rose Hill (Huddersfield Cricket League and Quaid-E-Azam League)
 Buttershaw St Pauls (Bradford Premier League)
 Crossflatts (Bradford Premier League)

 Golcar (Huddersfield Cricket League)
 Lightcliffe (Bradford Premier League)
 Northowram Fields (Bradford Premier League)
 Rastrick (Huddersfield Cricket League)
 Stainland (Huddersfield Evening League)

References

English domestic cricket competitions
Cricket in West Yorkshire